The Eurasia Movement is a Russian political movement founded in 2001 by the political scientist Aleksandr Dugin.
The organization follows the neo-Eurasian ideology, which adopts an eclectic mixture of Russian patriotism, Orthodox faith, anti-modernism, and even some Bolshevik ideas. The organization opposes "American" values such as liberalism, capitalism, and modernism.

References

See also 
 Eurasia Party

2001 establishments in Russia
Eurasianism
Far-right politics in Russia
Organizations established in 2001
Political organizations based in Russia
Russian nationalist organizations
Ruscism